Alexandra "Ra" or "Lexie" Dreyfus (born April 7, 1986) is an American actress, director, and writer. She is best known for her work directing music videos and commercials, photographing celebrities, and portraying Sarah Genatiempo in the Internet series lonelygirl15 and its spinoff LG15: The Resistance.

Career 
Dreyfus was born in Los Angeles. As a young adult, she appeared in soap operas, commercials and on Barbie boxes, as the face of Mattel. As an adult, she moved to Germany, where she trained under a Vogue photographer.

She moved back to LA, and worked in production for Bully Pictures and Bullrun car rallies. Alexandra then went on to star in a YouTube web series, Lonelygirl15.

Thus began a successful acting career. She moved to London, to be on a show for ITV 4. While abroad, she also wrote an opinion column for the British magazine Dapper. 
She then went on to become head-writer in Los Angeles for Digital Playground, earning a Best Picture AVN nomination for her script, Assassins.

For a time, Alexandra worked for Paris Hilton, after which she moved to New York City and developed a name for herself as a fine art photographer, Ra Dreyfus.

Alexandra is currently working on various projects, including her first animated comedy 'Jesse'.

Filmography 
 2007–2008: Lonelygirl15 as Sarah Genatiempo (a.k.a. theskyisempty99 – 49 episodes)
 2008: LG15: The Resistance as Sarah Genatiempo (2 episodes)
 2009: Dubplate Drama as Sasha
 2011: The World According to Paris as herself, Paris's assistant

References

External links 
 
 Dreyfus on LGPedia

1986 births
Living people
Video bloggers
American television actresses
American web series actresses
21st-century American actresses
American women bloggers
American bloggers
Fine art photographers
21st-century American singers
21st-century American women singers
21st-century American women writers
Actresses from Los Angeles